Stephen Lillie  (born 4 February 1966) is a British diplomat who was High Commissioner to Cyprus from 2018 to 2022.

Career
Lillie was educated at South Wolds Comprehensive School and The Queen's College, Oxford. He joined HM Diplomatic Service in 1988 and was sent for Chinese language training at the School of Oriental and African Studies and the Chinese University of Hong Kong 1989–91. He served in Beijing 1992–96, at the Foreign and Commonwealth Office (FCO) 1996–99, at Guangzhou as Consul-General 1999–2003, and in New Delhi 2003–06. He was head of the Far Eastern Department at the FCO 2006–09, then ambassador to the Philippines and also non-resident ambassador to Micronesia, the Marshall Islands and Palau 2009–13. He was Director, Asia Pacific, at the FCO 2013–17 and was then appointed to be High Commissioner to the Republic of Cyprus from April 2018.

Honours
: Grand Cross of the Order of Sikatuna, Rank of Datu (2 July 2013).
: Companion of the Order of St Michael and St George (CMG) (2017 Birthday Honours).

References

Living people
1966 births
Alumni of The Queen's College, Oxford
Consuls-General of the United Kingdom in Guangzhou
Ambassadors of the United Kingdom to the Philippines
Ambassadors of the United Kingdom to Palau
High Commissioners of the United Kingdom to Cyprus
Companions of the Order of St Michael and St George